Gustav Winckler may refer to:

 Gustav Winckler (1925–1979), Danish singer and composer
 Gustav Winckler (jurist) (1897–1980), German jurist
 Gustav Winkler (1867–1954), German industrialist